The "Little Rock" is the eponym of Little Rock, Arkansas. It is a now-reduced stone outcrop, projecting into the Arkansas River from its south bank, in the city's waterfront area, adjacent to the Junction Bridge, whose foundations include a portion of the rock. A portion of the rock outcrop has had a bronze plaque mounted on it. In 1818 the rock was used as a survey marker, and formed the starting point for land surveys in the region south of the river.

The Little Rock was listed on the National Register of Historic Places in 1970.

See also
National Register of Historic Places listings in Little Rock, Arkansas

References

Monuments and memorials on the National Register of Historic Places in Arkansas
Tourist attractions in Little Rock, Arkansas
Landforms of Arkansas
National Register of Historic Places in Little Rock, Arkansas